Henry L. Black (born January 3, 1997) is an American football free safety for the Indianapolis Colts of the National Football League (NFL). He played college football at Baylor.

College career
Black was a member of the Baylor Bears for five seasons, redshirting as a true freshman. He finished his collegiate career with 119 tackles, four tackles for a loss, two sacks, and two forced fumbles with eight passes defended and two interceptions.

Professional career

Green Bay Packers
Black was signed by the Green Bay Packers as an undrafted free agent following the 2020 NFL Draft on April 29, 2020. He was waived during final roster cuts, but signed to the team's practice squad the following day. He was elevated to the active roster on October 24 for the team's week 7 game against the Houston Texans and made his NFL debut the next day. Black forced a game-ending fumble that was recovered by the Packers in the 35–20 victory. He was returned to the practice squad following the game without having to clear waivers. He was elevated again on October 31, November 5, and November 14 for the weeks 8, 9, and 10 games against the Minnesota Vikings, San Francisco 49ers, and Jacksonville Jaguars, and reverted to the practice squad again after each game. On December 8, Black was signed to the active roster.

Black was named the fourth safety on the depth chart to begin the regular season. 2020 seventh-round pick Vernon Scott missed much of the season with injuries, and as a result, Black saw regular action as the Packers' dime safety. He recorded his first NFL interception on October 28, 2021, during a Week 8 win against the Arizona Cardinals, off a pass thrown by Kyler Murray. The Packers did not pick up Black's exclusive rights free agent (ERFA) tender, which would have given him a 1-year, $645,000 contract to stay with the team, making him a free agent for the 2022 season.

New York Giants
On May 18, 2022, Black signed with the New York Giants. On July 26, 2022, Black was waived.

Atlanta Falcons
On July 28, 2022, the Atlanta Falcons signed Black. He was waived on August 30.

Indianapolis Colts
On September 13, 2022, Black was signed to the Indianapolis Colts practice squad. He signed a reserve/future contract on January 9, 2023.

NFL career statistics

Regular season

Postseason

References

External links
New York Giants bio
Baylor Bears bio

1997 births
Living people
Players of American football from Shreveport, Louisiana
American football safeties
Baylor Bears football players
Green Bay Packers players
New York Giants players
Atlanta Falcons players
Indianapolis Colts players